Juutuanjoki is a river of Finland that flows from Lake Paatari in the municipality of Inari in Finnish Lapland into Lake Inari, which in turn flows into the Paatsjoki River towards Russia and into the Barents Sea.

See also
 List of rivers of Finland

Rivers of Finland
Paatsjoki basin
Rivers of Inari, Finland

External links